Anthony P. Koski (born June 26, 1946) is an American former professional basketball player. He played in the American Basketball Association (ABA) for the New York Nets in five games during the 1968–69 season. Koski also played in the Continental Basketball Association for the Hartford Capitols, in Germany for the Gießen 46ers, and in France for Nice's basketball club. He won the German Basketball Cup with the 46ers during the 1972–73 season.

References

1946 births
Living people
American men's basketball players
American expatriate basketball people in France
American expatriate basketball people in Germany
Becker Hawks men's basketball players

Giessen 46ers players
Hartford Capitols players
Junior college men's basketball players in the United States
Providence Friars men's basketball players
New York Nets draft picks
New York Nets players
Small forwards